Nosy Hara or Nosy Hara National Park is an uninhabited limestone islet off the northwest coast of Madagascar. It is the habitat of Brookesia micra, the smallest known chameleon. Since 2007, Nosy Hara has been part of a Marine Protected Area.

References

Islands of Madagascar
Diana Region
Uninhabited islands of Madagascar
National parks of Madagascar